Al-Herafyeen Sports Club is a Syrian football club based in Aleppo. It was founded in 1988. They play their home games at the Ri'ayet al-Shabab Stadium. Al-Herafyeen competed in the Syrian Premier League for the first time in the 2017–18 season.

References

Herafyeen
Association football clubs established in 1988
Sport in Aleppo
1988 establishments in Syria